Switzerland was represented by 22 athletes (12 men and 10 women) at the 2010 European Athletics Championships held in  Barcelona, Spain, from 27 July to 1 August 2010.

Participants

Results

References 
Participants list

Nations at the 2010 European Athletics Championships
Switzerland at the European Athletics Championships
European Athletics Championships